The expansion of the Louvre under Napoleon III in the 1850s, known at the time and until the 1980s as the Nouveau Louvre or Louvre de Napoléon III, was an iconic project of the Second French Empire and a centerpiece of its ambitious transformation of Paris. Its design was initially produced by Louis Visconti and, after Visconti's death in late 1853, modified and executed by Hector Lefuel. It represented the completion of a centuries-long project, sometimes referred to as the grand dessein ("grand design"), to connect the old Louvre Palace around the Cour Carrée with the Tuileries Palace to the west. Following the Tuileries' arson at the end of the Paris Commune in 1871 and demolition a decade later, Napoleon III's nouveau Louvre became the eastern end of Paris's axe historique centered on the Champs-Élysées.

Since 1993, all its spaces have been used by the Louvre Museum.

Project development

Following the French Revolution of 1848, the provisional government adopted a decree on the continuation of the rue de Rivoli toward the east and the completion of the Louvre Palace's north wing, building on the steps taken to that effect under Napoleon. Architect Louis Visconti and his disciple Émile Trélat produced a draft design for completing the entire palace and presented it to the Legislative Assembly in 1849. These plans were not implemented, however, until President Louis-Napoleon was in a position to prioritize them following his successful coup d'état on 2 December 1851, even before he would formally rebrand himself as Emperor Napoleon III. On Louis-Napoleon's order, Minister François-Xavier Joseph de Casabianca commissioned Visconti to design the new Louvre's plans on 30 January 1852, and the first stone was laid on 25 July 1852.

After Visconti died of a heart attack on 29 December 1853, Hector Lefuel, by then the architect of the Palace of Fontainebleau, was appointed to replace him. Lefuel modified Visconti's project, keeping its broad architectural outlines but opting for a considerably more exuberant decoration program that came to define the nouveau Louvre in the eyes of many observers. Old houses and other buildings that still encroached on the central space of the Louvre-Tuileries complex, between the Cour Carrée and the place du Carrousel, were swept clear. The project was swiftly executed, under the close attention of Napoleon III who visited the works on multiple occasions. The new buildings were substantially completed at the time of their inauguration by the emperor on 14 August 1857. The next day, which was the National Day as the date of "", the public was invited to roam the new buildings.

The young American architect Richard Morris Hunt, who had studied under Lefuel at the École des Beaux-Arts, worked on the Louvre as a junior architect between April 1854 and September 1855, as also did Italian architect Marco Treves from May 1854 to September 1857. Following Hunt's graduation, Lefuel made him inspector of the Louvre work and allowed him to design the façade of the  facing the rue de Rivoli.

Description

The Nouveau Louvre mostly consists of two sets of buildings or wings, on the northern and southern sides of the central space that is now called the Cour Napoléon. The new buildings were structured around a sequence of pavilions that were given names of French statesmen from Ancien Régime (North Wing) and Napoleonic times (South Wing), still used to this day: from the northwest to the southwest,  (the project's new name for the pre-existing pavillon de l'Horloge),  topping the eponymous staircase, and  also featuring a monumental staircase. (From 1989, the names of the three central pavilions have also been given to the entire respective wings of the Louvre museum complex.

Lefuel created two octagonal gardens at the center of the Cour Napoléon (now replaced by the Louvre Pyramid). In multiple parts of the project, Napoleon III emphasized his role as continuator of the great French monarchs of the past, and as the one who completed their unfinished work. On both sides of the Pavillon Sully, black marble plaques bear gilded inscriptions that read, respectively: "1541. François Ier commence le Louvre. 1564. Catherine de Médicis commence les Tuileries" and "1852-1857. Napoléon III réunit les Tuileries au Louvre." Separately, Napoleon III created a Musée des Souverains in the Louvre's Colonnade Wing to similarly emphasize the continuity of his rule with the long legacy of French monarchy and thus bolster his legitimacy.

On the eastern side of the Cour Napoléon, the project entailed no new building but rather the exterior refacing of the pre-existing palace whose interior rooms were left unchanged. For the central pavillon de l'Horloge's new western façade, Visconti took inspiration from both its eastern side designed by Jacques Lemercier in the 1620s and from the central pavilion of the Tuileries Palace, itself influenced by Lemercier's. The same inspiration shaped the pavilions named after Richelieu and Denon on the Cour Napoléon's northern and southern sides. Lefuel transformed Visconti's understated original design and added a profusion of elaborate sculptural detail. Despite being criticized by a number of observers, e.g. by Ludovic Vitet, Prosper Mérimée and Horace de Viel-Castel, Lefuel's treatment of the square-dome-roofed pavilions became a seminal model for Second Empire architecture in France and elsewhere.

The latter was acceded by the monumental  (known since the late 19th century as ), with sculpted decoration by Lefuel's friend Marie-Noémi Cadiot. Initial plans to locate the Minister of the Interior in the North Wing's eastern half were abandoned in the late 1850s.

On the same floor, between the Pavillon Denon and the Grande Galerie, Lefuel created a large Estates Hall for state events and ceremonies.

Below these prestige spaces was an extensive complex of stables for up to 149 horses and 34 carriages. At the center of it is the brick-and-stone , a monumental indoor space for horse-riding under the Salle des États, between two interior courts named after Caulaincourt (west) and Visconti (east). (The cour Caulaincourt was renamed after Lefuel following the architect's death in 1880.) The stables were nominally supervised by Great Equerry , whose spacious apartment was on the western side of the Cour Lefuel and adorned with a porticoed balcony. The South wing also included barracks for the Cent-gardes Squadron and lodgings for the palace's service personnel.

Statuary

Initially, Visconti's plan was to erect equestrian statues of Louis XIV and Napoleon I at the center of the Cour Napoléon's two octagonal gardens, and another one of Francis I in the Cour Carrée. This was ostensibly intended to emphasize his claim to legitimacy as the inheritor of France's two (royal and imperial) strands of monarchical development. This program, however, was not realized.

Nevertheless, sculptural profusion was one of the defining features of Lefuel's approach. Arguably the most salient component is the series of 86 statues of celebrated figures (hommes illustres) from French history and culture, selected by Napoleon III himself, each one labelled with their name. These include, following the order of the wings from northwest to southwest: 

Among the abundant architectural sculpture of the Nouveau Louvre, the pediments of the three main pavilions stand out:
 Pavillon Richelieu: "France distributing crowns to its worthiest children", by Francisque Joseph Duret (in which the figure of France has been viewed as a likeness of Empress Eugénie);
 Pavillon Sully: "Napoleon I above History and Arts", by Antoine-Louis Barye and Pierre-Charles Simart; 
 Pavillon Denon: "Napoleon III surrounded by Agriculture, Industry, Commerce and the Fine Arts", by Simart. 
The latter group includes the depiction of a steam locomotive, then representing cutting-edge technological progress, and the only surviving public portrayal of Napoleon III in Paris.

The South Wing's  was another opportunity for Lefuel to foster a rich structural program, which was executed in 1861 after the Nouveau Louvre's inauguration. Inside, the idiosyncratic hunting-themed capitals feature heads of horses and other animals, by Emmanuel Frémiet, Rouillard, Alfred Jacquemart, and Houguenade.

Later history

In 1861, the Pavillon de Flore was in serious disrepair. Following the successful completion of the Louvre expansion, Napoleon III endorsed Lefuel's plan to entirely demolish and rebuild both the Pavillon and the wing that connects it to the Nouveau Louvre's South Wing. As this structure took the full width of the building, the Grande Galerie was correspondingly cut short by about a third. The Southern façade was completely changed, as Lefuel disliked Jacques II Androuet du Cerceau's colossal order and replacing it with a replica of the earlier design attributed to Louis Métezeau further east. The project was completed in 1869 as an equestrian statue of Napoleon III by Antoine-Louis Barye was placed above the arches of the Grands Guichets.

That setting, however, did not last long, as the Second Empire came to its abrupt end. On 6 September 1870, days after the emperor's capture at the Battle of Sedan, Barye's equestrian statue was topped and destroyed. At the end of the Paris Commune on 23 May 1871, the Tuileries Palace was burned down, as was the Bibliothèque du Louvre. Lefuel, together with Eugène Viollet-le-Duc, defended the option of repairing the ruins, but shortly after both died the French parliament decided to tear them down in 1882, largely for political motives associated with the termination of the monarchy. After the remains of the Tuileries were razed in 1883, the layout that had been created by Napoleon III and Lefuel was fundamentally altered.

In the context of the Grand Louvre project initiated by President François Mitterrand in the 1980s, the French Finance Ministry was compelled to leave the Louvre's North Wing, in which it had been headquartered since 1871. While most of the interior spaces were gutted and rebuilt, the more artistically and historically significant ones were preserved and renovated. Meanwhile, the Cour Napoléon was radically transformed with the erection of the Louvre Pyramid.

Influence

The nouveau Louvre was highly influential and became the exemplar of the Napoleon III style, also known as Second Empire architecture, subsequently adopted in numerous buildings in France as well as elsewhere in Europe and in the world. Prominent examples include the Crédit Lyonnais headquarters in Paris, and in the United States, the Old City Hall in Boston (built 1862-1865), the State, War, and Navy Building in Washington DC (built 1871-1888), and the Philadelphia City Hall (built 1871-1901).

See also
 Palais Garnier
 Grand Louvre

Notes

Louvre Palace
Second Empire architecture